Lieutenant General Jay Bhagwan Singh Yadava (abbreviated as J.B.S.Yadava)(PVSM, AVSM, Vir Chakra, VSM) is a retired General of the Indian Army.

Life 
Yadava was commissioned into the 11th Gorkha Rifles of the Indian Army in 1964. He participated in the wars of 1965 and 1971. He was awarded the Vir Chakra for his bravery for his significant contribution in the Bangladesh Liberation War. From 1992 to 1994, he commanded the Rastriya Rifles against militancy in the state. He has also been the Deputy Chief of the Army Staff (India).

References 

Indian military personnel
Indian Army personnel
Recipients of the Vir Chakra